Fort Guadalupe (Spanish: Fuerte de Guadalupe) is a fort in the city of Puebla, in the Mexican state of Puebla.

See also
 Fort Loreto

References

Buildings and structures in Puebla (city)
Forts in Mexico